The Nantou shooting was a mass murder that occurred in Nantou City, Taiwan on September 21, 1959, when 29-year-old Army Captain Li Hsing-ju killed 10 people and wounded four others, before committing suicide.

Background
Li had fallen in love with 19-year-old Lu Mu-sheng, who rejected his advances and became engaged with her neighbour Yu Chuang Sheng, while he was stationed on the Quemoy islands. When Li returned home Lu introduced him to another girl, proposing that he should marry her instead.

Lu Mu-sheng and Yu Chuang Sheng were about to get married on the day of the shooting.

Shooting
In the early hours of September 21, at approximately 2 a.m., Li broke into the house of Lu Mu-sheng and her family, carrying with him two rifles. He fatally shot Lu's father, her 10-year-old sister, her two brothers, aged 14 and 6 years, as well as her 30-year-old fiance with a semi-automatic rifle, and then dragged her outside and critically wounded her with shots to the chest and leg.

Li also fired at two neighbours who came to investigate, killing one and wounding the other, and subsequently entered a second-storey apartment 50 yards away, where the girl to whom Miss Lu had introduced him lived together with her family. There he killed the girl's parents, her brother, and one of her sisters, and wounded herself and another sister of hers. When police arrived at the scene and asked him to surrender, Li committed suicide by shooting himself in the head.

References

Mass murder in 1959
1959 crimes in Taiwan
Deaths by firearm in Taiwan
Family murders
Murder in Taiwan
Murder–suicides in Asia
Mass shootings in Taiwan
Suicides in Taiwan
September 1959 events in Asia
1950s murders in Taiwan
1959 murders in Asia
Mass murder in Taiwan
Violence against women in Taiwan